The Watergate scandal refers to the burglary and illegal wiretapping of the headquarters of the Democratic National Committee, in the Watergate complex, by members of President Richard Nixon's re-election campaign and the subsequent cover-up of the break-in resulting in Nixon's resignation on August 9, 1974, as well as other abuses of power by the Nixon White House that were discovered during the course of the scandal.

1960s
 November 5, 1968: Richard Nixon elected President.
 January 20, 1969: Richard Nixon is inaugurated as the 37th President of The United States.

1970s
 July 1, 1971: David Young and Egil "Bud" Krogh write a memo suggesting the formation of what later became called the "White House Plumbers" in response to the leak of the Pentagon Papers by Daniel Ellsberg.
 August 21, 1971: Nixon's Enemies List is started by White House aides (though Nixon himself may not have been aware of it); to "use the available federal machinery to screw our political enemies."
 September 3, 1971: "White House Plumbers" E. Howard Hunt, G. Gordon Liddy, and others break into the offices of Daniel Ellsberg's psychiatrist Lewis Fielding looking for material that might discredit Ellsberg, under the direction of John Ehrlichman or his staff within the White House. This was the Plumbers' first major operation.
 By early 1972, the Plumbers, at this stage assigned to the Committee to Re-Elect the President (abbreviated CRP, but often mocked by the acronym CREEP), had become frustrated at the lack of additional assignments they were being asked to perform, and that any plans and proposals they suggested were being rejected by CRP. Liddy and Hunt took their complaints to the White House – most likely to Charles Colson – and requested that the White House start putting pressure on CRP to assign them new operations. It is likely that both Colson and White House Chief of Staff H.R. Haldeman did so, starting the chain of events that led to the Watergate break-ins a few months later. This narrative was confirmed in the famous "Cancer on the Presidency" conversation between Nixon and White House Counsel John Dean on March 21, 1973.
 May 2, 1972: J. Edgar Hoover dies; L. Patrick Gray is appointed acting FBI director.
 May 28, 1972: Liddy’s team breaks into DNC Headquarters at the Watergate complex for the first time, bugging the telephones of staffers.
 June 17, 1972: The plumbers are arrested at 2:30 a.m. in the process of burglarizing and planting surveillance bugs in the Democratic National Committee offices at the Watergate Building Complex.
 June 19, 1972: Despite efforts by Steve King, Martha Mitchell acquires a copy of the Los Angeles Times, and recognizes the name of one of the Watergate burglars, James W. McCord Jr., security director of the CRP.
 June 20, 1972: Reportedly based on a tip from Deep Throat (associate director of the FBI Mark Felt), Bob Woodward reports in The Washington Post that one of the burglars had E. Howard Hunt in his address book and possessed checks signed by Hunt, and that Hunt was connected to  Charles Colson. On the same day, Nixon and Haldeman have a conversation that is recorded by the White House taping system. Eighteen and a half minutes of this conversation will later be erased.
 June 23, 1972: In the Oval Office, H.R. Haldeman recommends to President Nixon that they attempt to shut down the FBI investigation of the Watergate break-in, by having CIA Director Richard Helms and Deputy Director Vernon A. Walters tell acting FBI Director L. Patrick Gray to, "Stay the hell out of this". Haldeman expects Gray will then seek and take advice from Deputy FBI Director Mark Felt, and Felt will obey direction from the White House out of ambition. Nixon agrees and gives the order. The conversation is recorded.
 September 15, 1972: Hunt, Liddy, and the Watergate burglars are indicted by a federal grand jury.
 November 7, 1972: Nixon re-elected, defeating George McGovern with the largest plurality of votes in American history.
 January 8, 1973: Five defendants plead guilty as the burglary trial begins. Liddy and James W. McCord Jr. are convicted after the trial.
 January 20, 1973: Nixon is inaugurated for his second term.
 February 28, 1973: Confirmation hearings begin for confirming L. Patrick Gray as permanent Director of the FBI. During these hearings, Gray reveals that he had complied with an order from John Dean to provide daily updates on the Watergate investigation, and also that Dean had "probably lied" to FBI investigators.
 March 17, 1973: Watergate burglar McCord writes a letter to Judge John Sirica, claiming that some of his testimony was perjured under pressure and that the burglary was not a CIA operation, but had involved other government officials, thereby leading the investigation to the White House.
 March 21, 1973: Dean tells Nixon there is a "cancer" on the presidency.
 March 23, 1973: The McCord letter is made public by Judge Sirica in open court at McCord's sentencing hearing. 
 April 6, 1973: White House counsel John Dean begins cooperating with federal Watergate prosecutors.
 April 27, 1973: L. Patrick Gray resigns after it comes to light that he destroyed files from E. Howard Hunt's safe. William Ruckelshaus is appointed as his replacement.
 April 30, 1973: Senior White House administration officials Ehrlichman, Haldeman, and Richard Kleindienst resign, and John Dean is fired.
 May 17, 1973: The Senate Watergate Committee begins its nationally televised hearings.
 May 19, 1973: Independent special prosecutor Archibald Cox appointed to oversee investigation into possible presidential impropriety.
 June 3, 1973: John Dean tells Watergate investigators that he has discussed the cover-up with Nixon at least 35 times.
 July 13, 1973: Alexander Butterfield, former presidential appointments secretary, reveals that all conversations and telephone calls in Nixon's office have been taped since 1971.
 July 18, 1973: Nixon orders White House taping systems disconnected.
 July 23, 1973: Nixon refuses to turn over presidential tapes to the Senate Watergate Committee or the special prosecutor.
 Vice President replaced:
 October 10, 1973: Spiro Agnew resigns as Vice President of the United States due to corruption while he was the governor of Maryland.
 October 12, 1973: Gerald Ford is nominated as vice president under the 25th Amendment.
 October 20, 1973: "Saturday Night Massacre" – Nixon orders Elliot Richardson and Ruckelshaus to fire special prosecutor Cox.  They both refuse to comply and resign. Robert Bork considers resigning but carries out the order.
 November 1, 1973: Leon Jaworski is appointed new special prosecutor.
 November 17, 1973: Nixon delivers "I am not a crook" speech at a televised press conference at Disney World (Florida).
 November 27, 1973: the Senate votes 92 to 3 to confirm Ford as vice president.
 December 6, 1973: the House votes 387 to 35 to confirm Ford as vice president, and he takes the oath of office an hour after the vote.
 January 28, 1974: Nixon campaign aide Herbert Porter pleads guilty to perjury.
 February 25, 1974: Nixon personal counsel Herbert Kalmbach pleads guilty to two charges of illegal campaign activities.
 March 1, 1974: In an indictment against seven former presidential aides, delivered to Judge Sirica together with a sealed briefcase intended for the House Committee on the Judiciary, Nixon is named as an unindicted co-conspirator.
 March 4, 1974: The "Watergate Seven" (Mitchell, Haldeman, Ehrlichman, Colson, Gordon C. Strachan, Robert Mardian, and Kenneth Parkinson) are formally indicted.
 March 18, 1974: Judge Sirica orders the grand jury's sealed report to be sent to the House Committee on the Judiciary.
 April 5, 1974: Dwight Chapin convicted of lying to a grand jury.
 April 7, 1974: Ed Reinecke, Republican lieutenant governor of California, indicted on three charges of perjury before the Senate committee.
 April 16, 1974: Special Prosecutor Jaworski issues a subpoena for 64 White House tapes.
 April 30, 1974: White House releases edited transcripts of the Nixon tapes, but the House Judiciary Committee insists the actual tapes must be turned over.
 May 9, 1974: Impeachment hearings begin before the House Judiciary Committee.
 June 15, 1974: Woodward and Bernstein's book All the President's Men is published by Simon & Schuster.
 July 8, 1974: The United States Supreme Court hears oral argument in United States v. Nixon.
 July 24, 1974: United States v. Nixon decided: Nixon is ordered to give up tapes to investigators. 
 Congress moves to impeach Nixon.
 July 27 to July 30, 1974: House Judiciary Committee passes Articles of Impeachment.
 Early August 1974: A previously unknown tape from June 23, 1972 (recorded a few days after the break-in) documenting Nixon and Haldeman formulating a plan to block investigations is released. This recording later became known as the "Smoking Gun".
 Key Republican Senators tell Nixon that enough votes exist to convict him. 
 August 8, 1974: Nixon delivers his resignation speech in  front of a nationally televised audience.
 August 9, 1974: Nixon resigns from office and Ford becomes president. 
 September 8, 1974: President Ford ends the investigations by granting Nixon a pardon.
 October 17, 1974: Ford testifies before Congress on the pardon, the first sitting president to testify before Congress since President Lincoln.
 November 7, 1974: 94th Congress elected: Democratic Party picks up 5 Senate seats and 49 House seats. Many of the freshman congressmen are very young; the media dubs them "Watergate Babies".
 December 31, 1974: As a result of Nixon administration abuses of privacy, Privacy Act of 1974 passes into law.
 January 1, 1975: John N. Mitchell, John Ehrlichman and H. R. Haldeman convicted of conspiracy, obstruction of justice and perjury.
 July 27, 1975: Church Committee, chaired by Frank Church, commences to investigate foreign and domestic intelligence-gathering activities.
 November 4, 1975: Ford replaces several Nixon cabinet members in the "Halloween Massacre", engineered by Ford aide Donald Rumsfeld. Richard Cheney, George H. W. Bush and Brent Scowcroft join Ford administration; Rumsfeld becomes Secretary of Defense; Henry Kissinger remains as Secretary of State but not National Security Advisor.
 May 5, 1976: Church Committee superseded by Senate Select Committee on Intelligence.
 November 2, 1976: Ford is defeated in the United States presidential election by Jimmy Carter.
 January 20, 1977: Jimmy Carter is inaugurated as the 39th President of The United States.
 May 4, 1977: Nixon gives his first major interview about Watergate with TV journalist David Frost.
 May 15, 1978: Nixon publishes his memoirs, giving more of his side of the Watergate saga.
 October 25, 1978: Foreign Intelligence Surveillance Act enacted, creating Foreign Intelligence Surveillance Court and limiting federal government domestic surveillance powers. Recommended by Church Committee.

1990s
 May, 1990: Publication of Wars of Watergate by Stanley Kutler, often cited as the definitive history of the Watergate Scandal.
 January, 1992: Publication of Silent Coup by journalists Len Colodny and Robert Gettlin, blaming Watergate burglary on John Dean who wanted to cover up involvement of his fiancée with a call-girl ring. Book endorsed by Liddy in his first major statement about Watergate case, prompting Dean to sue Liddy, Colodny and Gettlin for defamation. Dean's case was dismissed and settled out of court; DNC secretary Ida "Maxine" Wells, also implicated by Liddy in call-girl cover-up, sued for defamation but jury in that case deadlock and judge dismissed case in 2001.  The book, often dismissed as a revisionist, pro-Nixon apology or conspiracy theory, was also endorsed by Roger Stone.
 April 22, 1994: Richard Nixon dies aged 81, after suffering a stroke. In keeping with his own wishes, he was not given a state funeral, though his funeral service five days later was a high-profile affair, attended by all five living U.S. Presidents and a host of other VIPs.

2000s
 May 31, 2005: W. Mark Felt, former Associate Director of the FBI during the Watergate years, declares that he is Deep Throat; this declaration was later confirmed by reporters Bob Woodward and Carl Bernstein, although it was disputed by some writers.

References

Bernstein, C., & Woodward, B. (1974). All the President's Men. New York: Pocket Books.

Crime-related timelines
Watergate scandal
Watergate
Watergate